The Les Turner ALS Foundation is a non-profit organization based in Chicago that provides amyotrophic lateral sclerosis (ALS) patient services; supports events, education and awareness about ALS; and funds ALS research. Since it was founded, it has raised over $64 million.

History and programs 
The Foundation was founded by Les Turner, a Chicago businessman, and his family after he was diagnosed with amyotrophic lateral sclerosis (ALS) in 1976. Les Turner serves nearly 90 percent of ALS patients in the Chicago metropolitan area.

In 1979, the Les Turner ALS Research Laboratory was opened at Northwestern Medicine. Then, in 1986, the Lois Insolia ALS Clinic was opened at Northwestern to provide patient services. It was one of the first multidisciplinary ALS clinics opened in the United States.

In 1983, the Foundation started patient support groups.

In 1992, Les Turner ALS became a founding member of the International Alliance of ALS/MND Associations.

In 2002, the Foundation's main event, the ALS Walk for Life was started.

In 2014, the Les Turner ALS Research and Patient Center at Northwestern Medicine was created to "accelerate research and advance patient care". The Center was opened in addition to the continual operation of three research laboratories and the Lois Insolia ALS Clinic.

In 2015, Les Turner ALS released the campaign, "Freeze ALS", along with 12 ice sculptures around Chicago for ALS Awareness Month.

References

Further reading 
 Les Turner ALS Foundation honors Wendy Abrams

External links 
 Website
 Les Turner ALS Research and Patient Center at Northwestern Medicine

Organizations established in 1977
1977 establishments in Illinois
Medical and health organizations based in Illinois
Non-profit organizations based in Chicago
Amyotrophic lateral sclerosis